The following list of mines in Ukraine is subsidiary to the lists of mines in Europe article and Lists of mines articles. This list contains working, defunct and future mines in the country and is organised by the primary mineral output(s) and province. For practical purposes stone, marble and other quarries may be included in this list. Operational mines are demarcated by bold typeface, future mines are demarcated in italics.

Gold Mines 

 Muzhiyevo gold mine
 Berehove gold mine
 Kvasovo gold mine

Coal Mines
Almazna coal mine
Bazhanov coal mine
Bilorichenska coal mine
Bilozerska coal mine
Bilytska coal mine
Dobropilska coal mine
Faschivska coal mine
Hirske coal mine
Hlyboka coal mine
Kalinin coal mine
Kholodna Balka coal mine
Kirov coal mine
Komsomolets Donbasu coal mine
Krasnoarmiiska–Zakhidna coal mine
Krasnokutska coal mine
Krasnolymanska coal mine
Molodohvardiiska coal mine
Pivdennodonbaska 1 coal mine
Pivdennodonbaska 3 coal mine
Skochinsky coal mine
Stakhanov coal mine
Sukhodilska–Skhidna coal mine
Svitanok coal mine
Vinnytska coal mine
Yasynivska–Hlyboka coal mine
Zasyadko coal mine
Zhdanivska coal mine
Zhovtnevyi Rudnyk coal mine
Zuivska coal mine

Graphite mines
Zavalye mine

References 

Ukraine